Ticinepomis is an extinct genus of coelacanth lobe-finned fish which lived during the Middle Triassic period in what is now Switzerland. It contains a single species, T. peyeri. T. peyeri specimens are most common in the Besano Formation (or Grenzbitumenzone) of Monte San Giorgio in Ticino. Other coelacanths from Monte San Giorgio include a larger species (tentatively referred to Holophagus picenus) from the Besano Formation, and a species of Heptanema from the Meride Limestone. Larger Ticinepomis specimens have been found in the Prosanto Formation of Graubünden.

Ticinepomis was originally described as being a member of the family Coelacanthidae, being similar to Coelacanthus, Holophagus and Undina. Later, T. peyeri was placed in Latimeriidae. The bizarre Prosanto Formation latimeriid Foreyia is thought to be T. peyeris closest relative, as they share many features despite their drastically contrasting appearances.

References

Latimeriidae
Prehistoric lobe-finned fish genera
Triassic bony fish
Triassic fish of Europe
Fossil taxa described in 1980